John Howard Forester (April 2, 1887 – January 12, 1958) was a Canadian politician. He served in the Legislative Assembly of British Columbia from 1933 to 1941  from the electoral district of Vancouver-Burrard, a member of the Liberal party.

References

1887 births
1958 deaths